Callistemon 'Captain Cook' is a  cultivar of the plant genus Callistemon, widely grown as an ornamental plant.

History
The cultivar originated as a seedling of Callistemon viminalis. It was noted to have a more dwarf and bushy habit than usual and an abundance of flower buds as a young plant. Originally known and sold as 'Compacta', the name was changed to 'Captain Cook' to mark the 1970 bicentennial of James Cook's voyage to Australia. At a later stage, plants grown from seed were distributed under this name, and the true-to-type variety, which can only be propagated from cuttings became difficult to obtain.

Description
It forms a dense, slightly weeping shrub. Leaves are narrow and 50 to 60 mm long.

A proliferation of red "brushes" are produced in spring, with further flowering sometimes occurring in late summer or autumn.

Cultivation
Callistemon 'Captain Cook' is most suited to climates ranging from cool-temperate to semi-tropical.

A  sunny position enhances flowering, and it performs best when it can be watered during establishment and in spring. It is adaptable to most soils, but prefers well-composted loam. Pruning after flowering helps to maintain the plant's shape.

The cultivar must be propagated from cuttings to maintain its original characteristics. Insect problems include leaf-webbing caterpillars and scale.  A small amount of chicken manure or complete plant food  applied in spring is also of benefit to growth.

See also
 List of Callistemon cultivars
 Callistemon viminalis

References

External links

Captain Cook
Cultivars of Australian plants
Garden plants of Australia
Drought-tolerant plants
Ornamental trees